Greta Neimanas (born 4 May 1988) is an American Paralympic cyclist.

Biography
Neimanas was born in Evanston, Illinois. Her passion for cycling was born when she saw cycling track at the 2004 Summer Paralympics in Athens, Greece at the age of 16. There she entered an essay contest the theme of which was "What Ability Means to Me". In 2006, she became a United States Olympic Training Center athlete at the Colorado Springs. She won gold medals at both 2008 and 2012 UCI Para-cycling Track World Championships for cycling time trial and for the same sport won bronze medals in 2010 and 2011 at the same place. She also won 5 silver medals for her 2009, 2011, and 2012 cycling pursuits and for 2009 and 2012 time trials. From March 22 to March 25 she was a participant of the Redlands Bicycle Classic in a criterium race and on April 28 she did Devil's Punch Bowl Road Race. From June 21 to June 23 of the same year she participated at the 2012 USA Cycling Juniors for both criterium and road race and from June 28 to June 30 of 2012 did both the criterium and omnium race of the Tour of Americas Dairyland.

References

1988 births
Living people
Sportspeople from Evanston, Illinois
Paralympic cyclists of the United States
Cyclists at the 2008 Summer Paralympics
Cyclists at the 2012 Summer Paralympics
Medalists at the 2011 Parapan American Games